Gorgopis zellerii is a moth of the family Hepialidae. It is found in South Africa.

This species has a winglength of 21 mm.

References

Moths described in 1881
Hepialidae